Sir Lucas White King  (8 September 1856 – 23 August 1925) was an Anglo-Irish colonial administrator and academic, Professor of Oriental Languages at Trinity College, Dublin from 1905 to 1922.

Early life
He was born in Madras, British India on 8 September 1856, the eldest son of the Deputy Surgeon-General Henry King, also the Principal of the Medical School in Madras.

He was educated at Ennis College and Trinity College, Dublin, where he received BA and LLB degrees in 1878.

Career
In 1878, he joined the Indian Civil Service, rising to commissioner of the Rawalpindi Division, until his retirement in 1905.

In 1905, he was appointed professor of Oriental languages at Dublin University, a post he held until 1922 when he resigned and went to live in London.

He was knighted in 1919.

Personal life
He married Geraldine Adelaide Hamilton Harmsworth (1866-1945), eldest daughter of  Alfred Harmsworth and his wife, Geraldine, and sister of newspaper proprietors Alfred Harmsworth, 1st Viscount Northcliffe and Harold Sidney Harmsworth, 1st Viscount Rothermere.

They had issue:
 Elinor Mary Kathleen King
 Sheila Geraldine King
 Lucas Henry St. Aubyn King
 Enid Madeleine King, married Herbert Bland Stokes, youngest son of Sir Gabriel Stokes
 Cecil Harmsworth King, chairman of Daily Mirror Newspapers, Sunday Pictorial Newspapers and the International Publishing Corporation, and a director at the Bank of England
 Alfred Curzon White King
 Geraldine Sophie White King

References

1856 births
1925 deaths
Academics of Trinity College Dublin
Alumni of Trinity College Dublin
Companions of the Order of the Star of India
Fellows of the Society of Antiquaries of London
Indian Civil Service (British India) officers
Knights Bachelor